

Collaborative editing is the process of multiple people editing the same document simultaneously. This technique may engage expertise from different disciplines, and potentially improve the quality of documents and increase productivity.

Effective choices in group awareness, participation and coordination are critical to successful collaborative writing outcomes. The typing might be organized by dividing the writing into sub-tasks assigned to each group member, with the first part of the tasks done before the next parts, or they might work together on each task. The writing is planned, written, and revised, and more than one person is involved in at least one of those steps. Usually, discussions about the document's structure and context involve the entire group.

Most usually, it is applied to textual documents or programmatic source code. Such asynchronous (non-simultaneous) contributions are very efficient in time, as group members need not assemble in order to work together. Generally, managing such work requires software; the most common tools for editing documents are wikis, and those for programming, version control systems. Most word processors are also capable of recording changes; this allows editors to work on the same document while automatically clearly labeling who contributed what changes. New writing environments such as Google Docs provide collaborative writing/editing functionalities with revision control, synchronous/asynchronous editing.

Wikipedia is an example of an open collaborative editing project on a large scale, which can be both good and bad. Because of the large contributions by the public, Wikipedia has one of the widest ranges of material in the world. This also leads to online 'graffiti', in which members of the public can submit incorrect information or random rubbish, sometimes referred to as vandalism. Collaborative writing can lead to projects that are richer and more complex than those produced by individuals. Many learning communities include one or more collaborative assignments. However, writing with others also makes the writing task more complex. There is an increasing amount of research literature investigating how collaborative writing can improve learning experiences. Correct access management systems can prevent duplicated information. Access management systems require access to a server, often online. Online collaboration can be more difficult due to issues such as time zones.

See also
Collaborative real-time editor
Collaborative writing

References

Sources
Kuutti, Kari, Eija Helena Karsten, Paul Dourish, Geraldine Fitzpatrick and Kjeld Schmidt. (2003). ECSCW 2003: proceedings of the Eighth European Conference on Computer Supported Cooperative Work (14–18 September 2003, Helsinki, Finland). London: Kulwer. ; 
Speck, Bruce W. (2008). Collaborative Writing: An Annotated Bibliography. Charlotte, North Carolina: IAP (Information Age Publishing).

External links

Group Fiction: How to Write Fiction as a Group.

Collaborative writing
Editing